The history of K-1 can be called the history of Seidokaikan, which is a school of Full contact karate that preceded K-1.

Beginning (1993-1994)
K-1's eight-year history began with the revolutionary vision of Japan's Kazuyoshi Ishii. Following a rapid climb through the ranks as martial arts mentor, promoter, and official, Ishii thought it was time to organize a major martial arts event. Its concept was to decide the strongest martial artist in a night, inspired from Akira Maeda's Fighting Network RINGS. Maeda himself liked Ishii's K-1 concept and helped him to establish it.

Karate was closely resembling the style of kick boxing. Ishii organized the first K-1 Grand Prix at the Yoyogi Dai-Ichi Stadium in Tokyo on April 30, 1993. The event was held in a regulation-size boxing ring under the K-1 rules, which permit punches to accommodate both karate and kick boxing fighters. A crowd of 10,000 were on hand to witness history in the making as a young Ernesto Hoost and Peter Aerts, before they won a combined total of seven WGPs between the two. They faced one another in a preliminary fight of the Grand Prix. The match was an instant classic as they gave it their all but in the end it was Aerts' unfamiliarity with the three round style of K-1 (normal kickboxing fights usually have five rounds) that caused him to start out slow in the first round. He did not have enough time to catch up with the very capable Hoost who was awarded the unanimous decision. Hoost would knock out former UFC champion and former American kickboxing champion Maurice Smith in the semi finals with a headkick assuring; he advanced to the finals. Aerts' teammate Branko Cikatić was the big winner of the WGP that night as he put on a dominant performance knocking out Changpuek Kiatsongrit, Japan's then number one kickboxer Masaaki Satake, and Ernesto Hoost in the finals.

Later in the same year, the K-2 Grand Prix was held, which was a tournament in the light heavyweight class. Ernesto Hoost knocked out Changpuek Kiatsongrit in the final.

Golden Age (1994-1999)

Popular fighters in the K-1 during the golden age included, Masaaki Satake, Branko Cikatic, Changpuek Kiatsongrit, Peter Aerts, Ernesto Hoost, Andy Hug, Stan Longinidis, Jerome Le Banner, Mike Bernardo, Musashi, Mirko Filipović, Francisco Filho, Sam Greco, Stefan Leko, Ray Sefo, Matt Skelton, Rick Roufus, Lloyd van Dams, and Xhavit Bajrami.

1994
In 1994, K-1 held an event called "K-1 Challenge" which was headlined by a double main event. In the first main event, Japan's number one kickboxer Masaaki Satake took on Ernesto Hoost. The match ended rather quickly when Hoost scored with a high kick to Satake's head for the knockout. The second main event was an eagerly anticipated standoff between the reigning WGP champion Branco Cikatic and a famous karate champion Andy Hug. Hug was very well known in Japan as he had won numerous karate tournaments all over the world and had a very popular fighting style. The match was an exciting five rounder with both men knocking the other down but neither showing true dominance. In the end the judges gave Hug the very close unanimous decision to the cheers of the grateful crowd.

In the second edition of the World Grand Prix, the field of eight participants was stronger than the previous year. Along with the defending champion Branco Cikatic, Peter "The Dutch Lumberjack" Aerts, Satake, Andy Hug made his anticipated WGP debut. Many believed Hug was a heavy favorite to win it all considering he already beat Cikatic a few months earlier but that was not to be. In Hug's first fight he was upset by American kickboxer Patrick Smith in nineteen seconds after being knocked to the ground two quick times which stunned the Japanese crowd. After Hug's early elimination the WGP was anyone's to claim. Aerts, Satake and Cikatic all passed their first round fights with relative ease. In the semi-finals Smith was not able to upset Aerts as the "Dutch Lumberjack" took Smith out with a hard punch in the first round. In a rematch from last year's WGP Satake and Cikatic collided again but this time it was Satake who was given the win by unanimous decision. In the finals with a very hot crowd cheering them on, Aerts and Satake went a full three rounds before the judges crowned Peter Aerts the youngest and second ever K-1 World Grand Prix Champion at the age of 23, a record that as of 2008 is still intact.

Later in 1994, K-1 held their next event titled K-1 Revenge and was named because of the main event which showcased the rematch between Andy Hug and the man who upset his WGP chances earlier in the year, Patrick Smith. The crowd was very hot for this match and were purely behind Hug. In an amazing reversal of the outcome to their first match Hug was able to get his revenge by knocking out Smith with a knee to the face in less than a minute into the first round. The K-1 Revenge show also showcased a WKA title match between champion Dennis Lane and Masaaki Satake. The Japanese fans were of course behind Satake and to their enjoyment watched as his brutal leg kicks left Lane hobbling so badly that his corner threw in the towel in the second round giving Satake the title. Also on the card was the K-1 debut of another acclaimed kickboxing and karateka fighter, the Greek Stan Longinidis. Stan "the Man" debut against another champion, 1993 WGP champion Branco Cikatic. The match displayed both men's ability to dish out and take a beating but after five tough rounds Stan "the Man' was given the unanimous decision.

K-1 closed out 1994 with K-1 Legend a show that was headlined by Masaaki Satake against yet another debuting herald kickboxing champion, Australia born Sam Greco. In what many considered a dominating performance, Greco used his brute strength to pound Satake in the second round before he landed a hard solid right that put the Japanese fighter down for the count. In a rematch from the 1993 WGP finals, Branco Cikatic went against Ernesto Hoost. Hoost was looking for a chance to avenge his knock lost to the big Croatian but that was not meant to be as a mighty left hook put Hoost out cold on the mat in almost a repeat from their first fight.

1995
In 1995, K-1 decided to have a preliminary elimination round for their WGP. To determine the final eight, sixteen men duked it out. Along with fan favorites Ernesto Hoost, defending WGP champion Peter Aerts, Sam Greco and Stan the Man, a few new faces debuted in the K-1 ranks. Young French kickboxer Jerome Le Banner made his K-1 debut with a decision win over Muay Thai champion Nokueed Devy. Another man to make his K-1 debut albeit in more impressive fashion was South African fighter Mike Bernardo who was set up against Andy Hug, in another attempt to make it to the WGP. For Hug, like last year he would be upset again by a vicious flurry of strikes in the third round that displayed Bernardo's brutal power. Lastly Japanese kickboxer Masaaki Satake got his win over infamous street fighter Kimo in a horrible match that showed Kimo's lack of fighting ability.

In the 1995 WGP, Jerome Le Banner upset Satake with a brutal punch to the face that crumbled him to the mat in the third round. Two heavy head kicks from Mike Bernardo got him past Stan the Man. While both Peter Aerts and Ernesto Hoost easily passed their first round opponents to make it to the semi finals. In a very brutal fight both Bernardo and Le Banner took the fight to each other but it was Le Banner's leg kicks that literally crippled Bernardo and stopped his streak to the WGP finals. In another classic clash Aerts and Hoost went to an extra fourth round after their first three rounds were considered a draw. In the fourth round Aerts looked to be a bit more aggressive and was given the chance to defend his WGP title in the finals against Le Banner. In the finals Aerts made quick work over the young "French Cyborg" by punching him in the gut and crowning himself the first two time WGP champion.

1995 marked the beginning of K-1's expansion. The first K-1 Fight Night outside Japan took place in Switzerland with Andy Hug hosting. K-1 ended 95 with two big events. The first was the second K-1 Revenge. Like last year's edition K-1 Revenge II allowed Andy Hug the chance to gain revenge on a past lost, this time against Mike Bernardo. This time around Hug was not able to gain revenge and was knocked out in the second round by a mighty left hook. Also on the show defending WGP champion Peter Aerts fought against Kyokushin fighter Sam Greco in a very competitive five round battle. In the end Aerts was given the close decision. K-1 Revenge II was also significant for the debut of a young Seido Kaikan fighter, MUSASHI who end up becoming one of the most successful Japanese fighters in K-1. In MUSASHI's debut he was put against the man who defeated his idol, Andy Hug a year earlier, Patrick Smith. MUSASHI ended up defeating Smith in a dominating performance topped off with a 2nd-round KO.

The last event of 1995 was K-1's Hercules event which was headlined by two big matches. The first was a five-round battle between Andy Hug and Jerome Le Banner which ended in a decision win for Andy Hug. The main event was a big clash between defending WGP champion Peter Aerts and rising upstart Mike Bernardo, who was coming off two dominant wins over Andy Hug. The match was not long and ended in controversy when in the opening seconds Aerts gave Bernardo a flurry of punches one of which hit him right in the back of the head. Bernardo went down hard and was not moving for a few seconds which caused the referee to stop the fight. Immediately, when the bell rang Bernardo got up and protested the decision but the referee would not listen. This would mark the beginning of a very serious and personal feud between the two K-1 stars.

1996
1996 began with a bang in the WGP qualifier. Eight of the best K-1 fighters fought to gain their place in the WGP. The usual suspects won their fights with ease including defending two-time champion Peter Aerts, Ernesto Hoost, MUSASHI, Sam Greco, Mike Bernardo, Stan the Man and Andy Hug. "French Cyborg" Jerome Le Banner was supposed to join his fellow K-1 fighters and had a relative newcomer standing in his way named Mirko "the Tiger" but people today know him as Mirko Filipović. Before "Crocop" became a MMA star in PRIDE and UFC he started as a kickboxer in K-1. In his debut fight he stunned many by going toe to toe with Le Banner and got awarded a slim decision victory and a chance to participate in the WGP finals.

The 1996 WGP is, to many, one of the best K-1 WGPs in the history of K-1, not only due to the quality of competitors but because of the emotional ending. In the first match Mike Bernardo beat Peter Aerts with a right hook in the third round to avenge his controversial lost to the "Dutch Lumberjack" last year and end the chances of Aerts becoming a three-time WGP champion. In the second first round match two famous Japanese schools of Karate collided when Seido Kaikan fighter MUSASHI took on Kyokushin fighter Sam Greco. This match ended after one round when Greco broke his toe and could not continue. Ernesto Hoost took care of the young Mirko Filipović after three rounds while Andy Hug made even shorter work Duane Van Der Merwe after a vicious KO ending the fight in 40 seconds. In the semis Bernardo got the unanimous decision over MUSASHI, while Hoost faced Andy Hug in one of the best K-1 fights up to this point which went into an extra round and saw Hug win by a slim margin. In the miracle final Andy Hug, the man that was destined to become a K-1 WGP champion but was stopped prematurely two times in a row finally made it to the finals. After two rounds Hug wore down the mighty Bernardo with leg kicks which crippled Beranrdo significantly. After another brutal kick Bernardo crumpled to the ground and was given a standing eight count, the Japanese crowd were on their feet cheering on Hug. Seconds later a beautiful spinning leg sweep from Hug brought down Bernardo again and as the referee and crowd counted Bernardo out, Hug gave a triumphant cry of victory and finally became a WGP champion.

The third K-1 Revenge event was a star-studded affair. In this event reigning WGP champion Andy Hug added another title to his kickboxing career beating Stan the Man to win the World Muay Thai Championship after a brutal second-round knockout. With the theme of the K-1 Revenge being all about revenge the double header main event featured Sam Greco fighting against Musashi to avenge his early loss to the Seido Kaikan fighter when he broke his toe. In this fight neither fighter would be able to claim victory as during a heated struggle Musashi fell out of the ring and hit his head on the concrete floor. Dazed but determined to fight Musashi tried to continue but the doctor at ringside stopped the fight and called the fight a No Contest. In the main event the Bernardo/Aerts feud escalated to a new level. Trying to avenge his early WGP lost, Aerts started the fight aggressive as ever but less than midway through the first round one of his kicks hit Bernardo in the groin. Bernardo slowly crumbled to the ground but could not get up. The referee gave Bernardo time to recover but he was not moving and claimed he could not continue. With Bernardo unable to continue, the referee issued a DQ to Aerts for the low blow, giving Bernardo the win.

To end the 1996 year K-1 held two final events. The first titled Star Wars was just that, a war between the top stars of K-1. "Mr. Perfect" Ernesto Hoost took on the young Jerome Le Banner in a very back and forth contest. During the second it looked like Hoost would take another win but out of nowhere he got tagged hard by Le Banner seconds later Le Banner knocked Hoost down hard. The ref gave Hoost a standing eight count even though it was obvious that Hoost was completely out of it, the ref still gave Hoost the chance to continue fighting. This proved futile as seconds later Le Banner knocked Hoost completely out for the stunning upset. In the next fight eternal rivals Mike Bernardo and Peter Aerts clashed again. Results of their last few fights were still fresh in these two fighters minds as they went all out for a good three rounds till out of nowhere Bernardo blasted Aerts with a knockout blow giving Bernardo a 3–1 lead in their rivalry. To continue a trend, Andy Hug added yet another title to his collection by gaining the World KickBoxing Associate championship after a five-round slugfest with returning Japanese fighter Massaki Satake.

The final event of 1996 was the K-1 Hercules event. In this event for the first time two draws were given, the first between Mike Bernardo and Stan the Man and the second between Sam Greco and the "French Cyborg" Jerome Le Banner. The K-1 Hercules event is significant to K-1 fans due to it being the debut event of New Zealand fighter Ray Sefo. For Sefo he had the daunting task of fighting against "Mr. Perfect" Ernesto Hoost. For the young Kiwi, Sefo gave it his all but after a series of brutal leg kicks Sefo was unable to get off the mat and Hoost was awarded the KO victory. In the main event the streaking Hug was able to defeat the young MUSASHI.

1997
The 1997 K-1 Kings event was truly an affair fit for a king as reigning K-1 WGP champion Andy Hug took on two time K-1 champion Peter Aerts in the main event. The fight did not last long as Aerts stopped the streaking Hug with a heavy assault of punches that knocked the "blue eye samurai" out in the first round. Also on the card Mike Bernardo destroyed Masaaki Satake in two rounds while the very first WGP Champion Branco Cikatic made his K-1 return by overpowering the young MUSASHI in four rounds.

The 1997 K-1 Braves event was significant for several things. One of them was the debut of Stefan Leko, a young kickboxing champion from Germany. Another significant event was the return of Ray Sefo to the K-1 ring where he knocked out the French cyborg Jerome Le Banner with a crushing right hook dubbed the "Boomerang Hook". Also on the card Sam Greco fought his second consecutive draw with Andy Hug while the hot Mike Bernardo was stopped cold by the technical kicks of "Mr. Perfect" Ernesto Hoost.

The 97 Fight Night was headlined this year by Swiss Hero and reigning WGP champion Andy Hug facing the very hot Mike Bernardo. In a very hard hitting fight both men pushed each other to the limit but after three rounds the decision went to the hailing hero Hug.

The K-1 Dream event was aptly named that because of the "dream match" main event pitting Kyokushin Karate champion Franscisco Filho against reigning WGP and Seido Kaikan karate fighter Andy Hug. Karate purists were excited for this fight but were stunned by the results; in less than one round Filho knocked out Hug with an amazing right hook. This was truly the most amazing debut in K-1 history and put all other K-1 stars on notice that Filho was a contender not to take lightly. Also on the show Peter Aerts scored a huge knock out over the French Cyborg Jerome Le Banner by headkick. Ray Sefo gave a crushing beating over Jean Claude, while it only took Sam Greco two minutes to beat the first WGP champion Branco Cikotic into submission.

The 1997 WGP qualifier sent the best K-1 fighters to the WGP final, with newcomer Francisco Filiho, K-1 veterans Sam Greco, Jerome Le Banner, Ernesto Hoost, 2 time WGP Champion Peter Aerts, Masaaki Satake and defending WGP champion Andy Hug all made it past the qualifier. The first WGP champion, Branco Cikatic, made his K-1 return, but was defeated by Bernardo within seconds by an accidental headbutt which made a deep cut in his head causing the doctors to stop the fight and added Bernardo's name to the list of qualifiers.

The K-1 Grand Prix '97 Final was held for the first time at the Tokyo Dome, gathering 54,500 spectators. Filho continued his victorious first year in K-1 with an amazing 15 second knock out over Sam Greco in the first round. In a rematch from last year Ernesto Hoost was able to get revenge by knocking out Jerome Le Banner in an explosive furry in the first round. The never ending war between Peter Aerts and Mike Bernardo continued with their first round battle which saw Aerts walk away with the hard-fought TKO win after a kick to Bernardo's face finally put the big South African down. In the last quarter final match, defending WGP champion Hug made short work of Japan's Satake in only 15 seconds! In the semi finals the streaking Filiho came to a halt when Hoost muscled out a hard-fought three-round decision and a seat in the finals. While on the other side of the bracket WGP winners Hug and Aerts clashed in an amazing three round battle. In the end it was Hug who got the win and a chance to defend his championship. The finals saw Hoost prevent Hug's bid for a second K-1 title after three hard-fought rounds to win his first K-1 WGP title.

1998
The 98 K-1 season began with the K-1 Kings event which was headlined by newly crowned WGP champion Ernesto Hoost taking on two-time champion Peter Aerts. In another hard fought battle between the two K-1 legends, Aerts was able to score the win after knocking Hoost down in the first round and getting the unanimous decision.

The K-1 Braves event was headlined by the two most recognizable Japanese K-1 fighters; the veteran Masaaki Satake and the newcomer MUSASHI. After five hard fought rounds none of the judges saw a clear victor and thus the battle between the two Japanese greats ended in a rare K-1 draw.

In the annual K-1 Fight Night held in Switzerland, hometown hero Andy Hug squared off against Peter Aerts in an entertaining five round brawl. This would be the third fight between the two K-1 greats with each one having a win a piece. In the end after five rounds, Hug was given the win. On the undercard of the event Stefan Leko won the K-1 Europe GP earning a spot in the 16 man WGP qualifier.

The K-1 Dream card was truly a dream for K-1 fans. Since its inception, the goal of K-1 was to see what style was the better one between traditional stand up Karate and kickboxing. Over the years many top Karate champions have joined the ranks of K-1 and fought with some of the best kickboxers in the world. Now in K-1 Dream, the theme was a seven on seven, Karate team vs Kickboxing team, to prove which style was superior. In the opening bout debuting Kyokushin Karateka Nicholas Pettas fought against the young Croatian/German Stefan Leko. Leko did not go easy on Pettas and welcomed him to the K-1 with a second-round TKO. Another debuting Kyokushin Karateka, Glaube Feitosa did not fare any better as he was knocked out by Mike Bernardo, giving Team Kickboxing a commanding lead. British kickboxer Kirkwood Walker and Dutch karateka Xhavit Bajrami went to a draw. Japanese Karateka Masaaki Satake was crushed by another British kickboxer in Matt Skeleton, while fellow Japanese fighter MUSASHI was put down by Ernesto Hoost, giving Team Kickboxing the dominant win. During Sam Greco and Jerome Le Banner's fight, it looked like Team Karate would have a chance to at least gain one win when Greco knocked down LeBanner twice in the first round. BUt miraculously in the second, LeBanner threw a right cross that crumbled Greco to the canvas. In the main event the young Brazilian Francisco Filiho squared off with two time WGP champion Peter Aerts. During the first round Aerts hurt his leg and the fight had to be stopped awarding Filiho the tainted win, and at least prevent Team Karate from being shut out in the series.

1998 saw the first United States qualifier, which took place in Las Vegas. In K-1's debut show American Kickboxer, Rick Roufus won the US GP and earned a shot at the 16 man WGP qualifier. Headlining the show was a rematch from the very first WGP where Hoost took down Maurice Smith. This time Smith lasted the full three rounds but still lost the decision.

Back in Japan they were having their own GP qualifier that saw K-1 original Masaaki Satake win the GP and earn one last shot at a possible WGP victory.

In the 1998 WGP qualifier last year's final 8 (Francisco Filiho, Sam Greco, 2 time WGP champion Peter Aerts, Mike Bernardo, former WGP champion Andy Hug, Masaaki Satake and defending WGP champion Ernesto Hoost) minus Jerome Le Banner who was injured, were set up against a brand new batch of would be K-1 fighters to see who would go on to the finals. All of last year's fighters made it past the qualifying round and were joined by New Zealian Ray Sefo who out muscled Stefan Leko in the qualifiers.

The 1998 WGP is the shortest WGP to date with only one of the fights going to a decision. In the quarterfinals heavy favorite to make the finals Francisco Filiho was shockingly manhandled by Mike Bernardo in the third round, while it took Peter Aerts only one round to take down the Japanese Satake. In his crusade to return to the WGP finals, Andy Hug made short work of Ray Sefo while a cut forced this year's WGP defending champion Ernesto Hoost to quit sending opponent, Sam Greco to the semi finals. In the semis' the eternal rivalry continued as Aerts and Bernardo met once again. This would be the sixth time these two K-1 stars have collided and Bernardo was ahead 2–3. This time Aerts was able to tie it up by knocking out the big South African with seconds left in the first round. On the other side of the Semi finals, it took Andy Hug all three rounds to out muscle Sam Greco. In the finals Aerts became the first three time WGP champion by KOing Hug with a quick kick to the head inside of one minute in the first round. Not only did Aerts become a 3-time champion he also won this WGP in the quickest time ever 6 minutes 43 seconds. A record that stood until it was broken in 2009 by Semmy Schilt.

1999
In 1999, K-1 Revenge had some much eager rematches. The first was Japan's fading veteran Satake trying to avenge his brutal KO loss to Mike Bernardo. Satake did last a bit longer, all three rounds, but he still ended up losing the rematch. In the next Revenge match, New Zealander Ray Sefo was trying to avenge his loss to Andy Hug in the 1998 WGP Finals but an early kick to the groin plagued Sefo during the remainder of the match. Yet Sefo was all heart and every time he went down he kept coming back up to the cheers and support of the fans. By the fourth round Sefo was spent and his corner threw in the towel. In the main event Francisco Filiho was trying to avenge one of his few losses in K-1 to Mr. Perfect Ernesto Hoost. Filiho took down Hoost in less than 2 minutes from a barrage of hooks, earning his revenge.

K-1 held three preliminary tournaments to determine six competitors to face the final eight fighters from last year's tournament (K-1 chose two other fighters to fill the final spots). In the first tournament (held at the "K-1 Braves" event) both former WFCA kick boxing champion Lloyd van Dams and Xhavit Bajrami were sent to the Final Elimination round. The second tournament ("K-1 Dreams") saw K-1 veteran Stefan Leko and Samir Benazzouz go forward. The final preliminary tournament held at the K-1 Japan event saw Musashi receive a pass along with Nobu Hayashi. In the 1999 Final Elimination event, these six winners along with Mirko Filipović and IFKA Superheavyweight champion, Matt Skelton, were matched up with the previous year's eight finalists minus Brazilian Francisco Filiho (who was injured) and replaced by a returning fan favorite, Jerome Le Banner.

In the WGP Qualifier all of last year's finalists proved to be too tough for the new up-and-comers except for Mirko Cro Cop who made his triumphant K-1 return by taking down Mike Bernardo and MUSASHI, who defeated Satake in a fight that many point to as the passing of the torch from one Japanese star to another.

In the 99 WGP Mirko Cro Cop continued his return to K-1 by pummeling MUSASHI, while in the upset of the night the French Cyborg Jerome Le Banner took down defending WGP champion Peter Aerts. In the other quarter-final matches Sam Greco out-muscled Ray Sefo while in a rematch from the 97 WGP Ernesto Hoost avenged his loss to former WGP champion Andy Hug. In the semifinals Mirko Cro Cop cemented his ticket to the finals with a knockout win over Sam Greco while Ernesto Hoost took down the hard-punching Jerome Le Banner. In the finals Hoost took advantage of what looked to be a rib injury to Mirko by attacking the body until Mirko could not continue, earning Hoost his second WGP title.

Turn of the century (2000-2001)
Along with many of the fighters from the golden age, the turn of the century also introduced many new fighters. Many of whom debuted in the K-1 in either 1998 or 1999 but started to gain popularity in 2000 and 2001. This would include, Jörgen Kruth, Nicholas Pettas, Alexey Ignashov, Jan Nortje, Remy Bonjasky, Ramon Dekkers, Hiromi Amada, Cyril Abidi, Glaube Feitosa, Doug Viney, Masato, Mark Hunt, Tsuyoshi Nakasako, and Peter Graham.

2000
2000 marked the beginning of K-1's fascination with tournaments; 13 tournaments (8 preliminaries, 3 major blocks and then the final two) were held to determine who would make the trip to Tokyo for the World Grand Prix. This time everyone had to earn a spot, including the eight finalists of last year. After the three block tournaments, six men were set for the WGP (Le Banner, Hoost, Abidi, Filho, Bernardo and Cro Cop). Musashi won the Japan GP to go forward while the last slot went to Peter Aerts. Just weeks before the tournament was set to start, both Mike Bernardo (injured) and Jerome Le Banner (sick) had to withdraw. Ray Sefo and Stefan Leko were chosen as replacements.

2000 would mark the beginning of a new century but would also mark the tragic end of a great career and life. Andy Hug, a former WGP champion and fan favorite died on August 24, 2000, due to leukemia a few weeks before his 36 birthday. The whole K-1 community and world mourned the passing of the "blue eyed samurai".

The 2000 WGP opened up with a rematch from last year's finals between defending WGP champion Ernesto Hoost and Mirko Cro Cop. This time Cro Cop lasted all three rounds but still could not muscle out the decision win. Ray Sefo made short work of MUSASHI while it took an extra round for Francisco Filiho to beat upstart Stefan Leko. In the last quarterfinal match 3 time WGP champion Peter Aerts was faced against French hot head Cyril Abidi. During the fight Abidi used every trick in the book to try and beat the more experienced Aerts. This included multiple head butts which resulted in Aerts bleeding so bad that even though he won the fight he could not continue to the next round. Due to this, Abidi got the bid to advance. In the semi finals Hoost and Filiho had another epic encounter that would be considered the fight of the night. In the end Hoost would go on to defend his championship in the finals. While on the other side of the bracket Sefo made short work of Abidi to make it to his first WGP finals. In the finals, Hoost claimed a third WGP title by winning via decision over Ray Sefo.

2001
In 2001, K-1 expanded the qualifying tournament process again to four qualifying tournaments and two repechage (second chance or loser bracket) tournaments. Like last year, everyone had to qualify to make it to the World Grand Prix in Japan. In the finals of the Osaka GP, Jerome LeBanner beat newcomer Adam Watt. In the Melbourne GP, defending WGP champion Ernesto Hoost defeated Matt Skelton. The big surprise at Melbourne was when young Mirko was knocked out by relative unknown Michael McDonald. In the Nagoya GP, 23-year-old Alexey "the Red Scorpion" Ignashov beat Lloyd van Dams. The last qualifying tournament took place in Las Vegas. In the final, Aerts was knocked out by Stefan Leko.

In Fukuoka there were two four men repecharge tournaments. In the first, Filho defeated Sergei Ivanovich and then won the tournament by beating Lloyd Van Dams. In the finals of the other tournament, Mark Hunt beat Adam Watt. The final two spots of the WGP were given again to Peter Aerts and to the K-1 Japan winner (who was Nicholas Pettas this year).

The WGP 2001 started out with defending champion Ernesto Hoost beating the young Stefen Leko to a three-round decision victory. Following that match was what many considered one of the most hard hitting fights in K-1 history, "The French Cyborg" Jerome LeBanner fought Mark Hunt. Hunt knocked out the favorite LeBanner in the second round. Alexey Ignashov won by KO when a well-placed knee broke the nose of his opponent Nicholas Pettas. The final first round match placed three-time champion Peter Aerts against Kyokushin Kaikan champion Francisco Filho. A misplaced kick from Aerts to Filho's elbow caused Aerts ankle to swell up, this forced Aerts to end his run for a fourth title early. Ernesto Hoost was forced out after a foot injury, allowing his first round opponent Stefen Leko to advance against Mark Hunt. In the semi-final rounds, Leko lost to Hunt by decision and Filho held off Ignashov. In the finals, Mark Hunt, who was eliminated twice on his way to getting to the WGP, was crowned the 2001 WGP champion after a three-round decision.

The Dark Ages of K-1 (2002-2003)
The main newcomers and other important fighters in the K-1 during the Dark Ages include, Semmy Schilt, Andy Souwer, Albert Kraus, Bob Sapp, Carter Williams, and Michael McDonald.

2002
In 2002 the K-1 heads decided to stop the long-winded tournaments as it was putting a strain on matchmakers and the fighters, as evidenced by the injuries in the last two years. So instead, they had one eight-match event with the winners going on to the finals in Tokyo. Fifteen of the fighters were chosen by K-1 while the last fighter, Michael McDonald, qualified by winning the K-1 Las Vegas tournament. The one night event was held in Saitama. Defending WGP champion Mark Hunt beat Mike Bernardo, Ray Sefo won against Martin Holm. Peter Aerts got a hard-fought victory over Glaube Feitosa while Stefan Leko defeated Alexey Ignashov in four rounds. Michael McDonald faced  Semmy Schilt and took him the distance, but did not win. Jerome LeBanner beat K-1 newcomer Gary Goodridge in just 42 seconds. The main event of the night is probably one of the most infamous fights in K-1 history: in a surprise result, Hoost lost to newcomer Bob Sapp, a former American Football player and professional wrestler.

Later, however, after Schilt announced he would not be competing due to injury, the K-1 heads decided to set up a rematch between Hoost and Sapp. Sapp again relied on his brute strength and after pounding Hoost in the corner for a minute, the referee stopped the match and gave a TKO victory to Sapp. However, during the fight, Sapp injured his hand and could not continue thus allowing Hoost to move on to the next round. In a more technical match, Ray Sefo took Peter Aerts to three rounds and won with a very close split decision. Defending WGP champion Mark Hunt beat Stefan Leko with a third-round KO, while Jerome LeBanner knocked out K-1 Japan champion Musashi in two rounds. In the semi-finals, Hoost beat Sefo and the judges awarded victory to LeBanner against Hunt. In the final, Hoost met LeBanner for the fifth time and overcame him to claim his unprecedented fourth title, thus solidifying his nickname, "Mr. Perfect".

2003
In 2003, K-1 founder, Kazuyoshi Ishii was charged and subsequently found guilty of tax evasion, by which he had to serve 22 months in prison. Former K-1 fighter and part-time event referee Nobuaki Kakuda, business man Sadaharu Tanikawa and fighter Bob Sapp took over as head producers of K-1 ensuring its survival. However the dynamics of K-1 changed, showcasing big muscular men that would wow the crowd with their size if not their skills. These shows were nicknamed "Beast" shows, sharing the same nickname as Bob Sapp. Even though Bob Sapp became a sensation in Japan the previous year the two "K-1 Beast" events held were disappointments in both match quality and revenue.

Despite these changes, K-1 still moved forward filling in the slots for the 2003 K-1 WGP. There were four qualifying and one repecharge tournaments to fill in the remaining slots for the elimination round being held in Osaka that also included the final eight fighters from last year. American kickboxer Carter Williams earned a place with his win in the Las Vegas GP. K-1 newcomer Jerrell Venetian won the GP in Basel. Alexey Ignashov made his K-1 return by winning in Paris. Peter Graham won the GP in his home city of Melbourne while another K-1 newcomer Remy "Flying Gentleman" Bonjasky qualified for the WGP by winning the repecharge GP.

The Osaka event suffered from problems: three K-1 favorites, Jerome LeBanner, Mark Hunt and Ernesto Hoost were out, the former two due to injury while Hoost was afflicted with a rare skin disease. To replace them, K-1 had to call in an aging Sam Greco, an unprepared Mike Bernardo, and Francisco Filho whose last fight was in 2001. K-1 filled the final two slots with Cyril Abidi and former heavyweight boxer Francois Botha (part of the new "freak show" initiative). Aerts dispatched Jerrell. Ignashov knocked out Mike Bernardo, while Sam Greco injured himself and had to quit his fight against Peter Graham. Stefen Leko dominated Francisco Filho in three rounds for the unanimous decision. Carter Williams hit Ray Sefo twice below the waist and then elbowed him in the back of the head which injured Sefo so badly that he could not continue the fight. Due to the rules of the match, the judges had to judge the fight by the first round (the elbow strike was deemed accidental) and Sefo was given the win. In the last two matches, both Botha and Sapp were disqualified for hitting Abidi and Bonjasky while they were on the ground in blatant illegal moves.

The 2003 WGP finale took place in the Tokyo Dome. In the first round Francois Botha lost to Cyril Abidi, Peter Graham lost to the young Remy Bonjasky. Musashi won against Ray Sefo in a very close fight, and finally "Mr. K-1" Peter Aerts decisively beat Alexey Ignashov. In the semis Bonjasky beat Abidi in less than 2 minutes and Musashi beat Aerts in an exciting three rounds. In a close final the judges gave the victory to Remy Bonjasky, thereby ushering in a new generation of fighters.

Return to excellence
Important fighters since 2004 include, Mighty Mo, Buakaw Por.Pramuk, Kaoklai Kaennorsing, Aleksandr Pitchkounov, Hong-man Choi, Errol Zimmerman, Badr Hari, Zabit Samedov, Gökhan Saki, Junichi Sawayashiki, Min-soo Kim, Keijiro Maeda, and Sergei Gur.

2004
In 2004, Chad Rowan a.k.a. Akebono, the first non-Japanese sumo wrestler to win the top ranking as Yokozuna, made his debut in K-1. His much-anticipated first fight was against the "beast" Bob Sapp. However, Bob Sapp overpowered the slow Akebono in just three minutes. In the following K-1 event held in the Saitama Super Arena. Akebono faced a smaller, possibly more manageable, Musashi. The heads of K-1 assumed that Akebono's over 250 lb weight and 7 inch height advantage would make up for his lack of talent. However, although Akebono did not get knocked out he did lose by a unanimous decision.

There were three qualifying tournaments for the 2004 WGP and also one repecharge tournament in Las Vegas. The first LV GP crowned McDonald as the winner taking out former boxing champion Dewey Cooper. In the Japanese GP in Shizuoka, heavy favorite, Mike Bernardo was knocked out in the first round of his fight and "The Beast" Bob Sapp was decisively beaten by Ray Sefo in the second round. Hiromi Amada won the tournament. In Seoul, Korea, the first Asian GP was held and Akebono lost again in the first round by unanimous decision. The eventual winner was Kaoklai Kaennorsing, a former Muay Thai fighter, who was the smallest fighter in the tournament (5'9" and 176 lbs). In the repecharge tournament, Akebono lost again, this time to American kickboxer Rick Roufus. Newcomer Mighty Mo Siligia won the final slot into the WGP.

The new GP winners (McDonald, Amada, Kaoklai, Mighty Mo) along with last year's final eight (Abidi, Botha, Sefo, Musashi, Ignashov, Aerts, and defending WGP champion Bonjasky minus an injured Graham) entered the Final Elimination event in Tokyo. To fill in the final few slots the K-1 Directors selected four time WGP champion Ernesto Hoost, Glaube Feitosa, Gary Goodridge and the "French Cyborg" Jerome Le Banner to compete. In the first fight Mighty Mo beat Gary Goodridge in the first round. The second fight was between Alexey Ignashov and Kaoklai Kaennorsing. After three rounds, the judges called the match a draw forcing it to go one extra round where the young Kaennorsing won by the smallest of margins in a split decision. Both former WGP champions, Peter Aerts and Ernesto Hoost each won their matches in three rounds. K-1 veteran Ray Sefo beat Japan GP winner Hiromi Amada. In this year's elimination tournament the defending WGP champion was given a bye straight to the final eight but still had to fight a superfight match. For Remy Bonjasky the K-1 directors decided to match him up with Akebono who again lost. Musashi just won against Cyril Abidi, and Francois Botha beat Jerome Le Banner when after the match was called a draw, the Le Banner could not continue the fight for the fourth round and instead gave up.

The 2004 WGP was controversial: many K-1 fans and media members cited numerous matches in this WGP as suspicious of unfair/poor judging by the ringside judges. However, the first fight of the night had no controversy as the diminutive Kaoklai Kaennorsing took on the heaviest fighter of the night, Mighty Mo. Kaennorsing took him down with a swift kick to the head in the first round. The second fight was the first controversy of the event, as Japanese kickboxer Musashi took on favorite Ray Sefo. The judges decided to call the fight a draw and force an extra round, after which the judges awarded the victory to Musashi. After the fight Sefo criticized the judges harshly. In the third fight Peter Aerts took on Francois Botha which Botha won without throwing a punch: Aerts threw a series of kicks before turning away in serious pain. Doctors later diagnosed Aerts with a torn calf muscle. In the next fight defending champion Remy Bonjasky took on four time WGP champion Ernesto Hoost. The fight went into an extra round in which it appeared that Hoost had the better strategy, but in the end Bonjasky was given the win to the noticeable disgust of the usually composed Hoost.

In the first semi-final Musashi took on Kaennorsing. After three rounds the majority of the judges saw it as another draw, sending the fight into an extra round in which Musashi was judged victor. Bonjasky won the other match after landing a kick that knocked the Botha down. In the third round of the final, Bonjasky vs Musashi, a missed flying high kick sent Bonjasky crashing out of the ring into the announcers table. Time had to be stopped to check on the visibly shaken Bonjasky, but he wanted to continue the fight. After the first three rounds the judges saw the fight even and forced it into an extra round. In the fourth, the fight was called a draw again. In the fifth round both fighters were tired and sloppy, but the judges finally picked Bonjasky as the winner, after fighting a record 12 rounds in one night.

2005
The 2005 K-1 season started with the emergence of the 7'2" former Korean Ssireum wrestler Hong-man Choi. Similar to Akebono, Choi was a celebrated fighter in his native country who decided to pursue a career in K-1. His debut was at the Asia GP where in the second round he faced Akebono and won after only 24 seconds. In the finals Choi faced last year's Asia GP winner Kaoklai Kaennorsing. On paper the match was very uneven with Kaoklai being 5'9" and Choi 7'2" but Kaennorsing took the giant to an extra 4th round. Yet Choi's size and reach advantage gave him the win from the judges.

In Las Vegas, K-1 veteran Glaube Feitosa knocked out favorite Gary Goodridge in the first round. While in Paris at the Europe GP, Semmy Schilt made his return to K-1 by winning the tournament in easy fashion. Bob "the Beast" Sapp won the Japan GP quite easily. In Hawaii the Oceania GP was held and won by fan favorite Gary Goodridge who knocked out former Japan GP champion Yusuke Fujimoto. Finally the repecharge tournament held in Las Vegas was won by 21-year-old Ruslan Karaev.

In the elimination event held in Osaka the GP winners along with Jerome Le Banner (selected by the K-1 heads) faced last year's final seven (Musashi, Kaoklai, Mighty Mo, Ray Sefo, Peter Aerts, Francois Botha and Ernesto Hoost). Ernesto Hoost had to back out due to injury and was replaced with Rickard Nordstrand. The first fight had Ray Sefo take on Kaoklai Kaennorsing who took the fight to a decision which Sefo won by a slim margin. Ruslan Karaev took out Nordstrand by a unanimous decision victory. Glaube Feitosa took Semmy Schilt to a decision but loss. Defending WGP champion Remy Bonjasky received a bye but still had to fight: his opponent was Alexey Ignashov. The fight went a full extra round, but Ignashov received the lost. In the other elimination fights, Le Banner beat Goodridge in the first, while Aerts took two rounds to take out Mighty Mo. Musashi won against Botha after a decision. In the main event of the night the "Beast" Bob Sapp took on the "Giant" Hong-man Choi. Choi won by a 2-0 majority decision after winning the third and final round 10–8, because Sapp received an eight-count after being hit by a knee to the face.

In the first match of the 2005 WGP, Bonjasky took on Choi and got the unanimous win. The next match was between Sefo and Schilt which Schilt won by a decision. The match between Le Banner and Aerts went to an extra round decision in which the judges thought Aerts did just enough to win. The last first round match pitted Musashi against Ruslan Karaev. The fight went to another extra round decision that saw Musashi the winner. In the first semifinal match Remy Bonjasky lost to Schilt after Schilt caught him with a knee to the gut that Bonjasky could not get up from. Before the second semi-final match it was announced that Peter Aerts could not continue due to injury, and his opponent Le Banner could not continue either. Therefore, the first reserve fighter winner Glaube Feitosa (who had defeated Gary Goodridge earlier in the night) was granted the spot in the semifinal against Musashi and, to the surprise of many, won. The final of the 2005 WGP was therefore between Schilt and Feitosa. In the end it took the "Hightower" Semmy Schilt 48 seconds to win KO Feitosa with a knee strike and win the WGP.

2006
At the start of 2006 K-1 decided to instill a major rule change and that was to discourage the usage of a clinch. For those not familiar with kickboxing, Muay Thai or even boxing, the clinch is a technique where one fighter grabs the other fighter to immobilize them. Sometimes it is used to set up a knee strike (mostly used in Muay Thai and kickboxing) other times the clinch is used when a fighter is tired, or stunned from a punch and they clinch with their opponent so that fighter cannot strike them again. Not only is it a technique but it can be VERY important strategy wise. Anyway, at the beginning of the year the K-1 heads decided to discourage the usage of the clinch in order to create more exciting fights as it seemed to many tired fighters were using the clinch way to often resulting in slowing down the pace of fights. This move upset many of the K-1 fighters as it would force them to change the way they fought, as well as upset many of the K-1 purists who do not like change. The “no clinch” rule would affect many important fights throughout the year, and none more important than the first major fight of the year between defending K-1 WGP champion Semmy Schilt and three time WGP champion Peter Aerts.

The setting was the first K-1 WGP qualifier event in Auckland, New Zealand. During the fight the smaller Aerts took the fight to the mighty Schilt and looked to actually cause the defending champion some problems. Yet what gave Schilts a bigger problem was the “no clinch” rule as he was warned numerous times about clinching with Aerts and ultimately lost two points. The catch was that during the fight Schilt was not clinching nearly as much as his opponent Aerts, yet it seemed the referee would ignore Aerts violation of the rule and continuously cite Schilts. In the end the fight went to a decision and it came to a majority ruling in favor of Peter Aerts (with one of the judges ruling it a draw and two of the judges giving Aerts a slight advantage of 29–28). In the end those two points that Schilt's lost would have made a BIG difference in the outcome, possible even giving Schilts the win. This would not be the first controversial ruling of the year but definitely one of the big ones.

During the Melbourne GP Polish Muay Thai practitioner Paul Slowinski knocked his way to the WGP by knocking out Rony Sefo, brother of K-1 vet Ray Sefo, K-1 fan favorite Peter Graham and Jason Suttie in the finals. The main event of the Melbourne GP show was a superfight between New Zealander Ray Sefo and former boxing champion Francois Botha. The fight went to a decision with all three judges ruling in favor of Sefo. The next qualifier was an exciting event in Las Vegas. K-1 and PRIDE veteran Gary Goodridge took less than two minutes to dispose of his first two opponents and make it to the finals making him an instant favorite to take the whole tourney. Yet when the dust was cleared it was actually surprising darkhorse Chalid ‘Die’ Faust who qualified for the WGP after knocking out Goodridge in the third round. Ironic enough Faust lost in the semi finals of the Vegas GP to K-1 veteran Carter Williams but after the fight Williams could not continue due to injury. This allowed Faust to enter the finals and make it to the WGP.

Also on the Vegas card were a few great superfights. K-1 wunderkid Ruslan Karaev defeated K-1 veteran Stefan Leko by decision in an amazing match of pure action. Former pro wrestler Slyvester “Predator” Terkay gave Korean giant Hong-man Choi his toughest challenge to date and even though the fight went to a decision win for Choi many fans that attended the show believed Terkay was the real winner. The last superfight was between defending WGP champion Semmy Schilt and Japan's favorite son, MUSASHI. In the fight it was obvious to everyone that Schilt was too much for MUSASHI but to the Japanese fighter's credit he would not stay down and made the fight go to a decision. The result was a unanimous win for Schilt.

The Amsterdam GP qualifier will go down as the most controversial event of 2006, maybe even in K-1 history. The night began with a super fight between K-1 veteran Jerome Le Banner and two time WGP champion Remy Bonjasky. During this fight it appeared pretty obvious to everyone that the usually light footed Bonjasky was very sluggish which the power puncher Le Banner took advantage of. After three rounds it looked to be that LeBanner was going to walk away with a victory but instead it was a unanimous decision for Bonjasky. Le Banner was shocked and even the crowd started booing the decision. After the event Le Banner filed an appeal threatening to never fight in K-1 again unless the decision was over turned. In the end the K-1 organization agreed to overturn the decision. The night of controversy continued and had a bigger impact on the actual card itself.

One of the marquee matches of the night was to be the "retirement" match for 4 time WGP champion Ernesto Hoost, who hand picked his final opponent to be the "Beast" Bob Sapp. Many K-1 fans were eager for the fight and very familiar to the bad blood between these two fighters. Hours before the show even began Bob Sapp arrived to the arena very upset. Apparently for the last few months Sapp was under negotiation to renew his contract with K-1. According to Sapp K-1 organizers agreed to a new contract but kept delaying Sapp from looking at it and signing it. Sapp told them he was not going to fight until he saw and signed the contract. The K-1 heads reassured Sapp that his new contract will be at the Amsterdam show and ready to be signed before the event started. Sapp arrived to the arena but no contract was produced. He started telling K-1 heads that he would not fight until he saw the contract which the K-1 heads told him they could not do. Sapp then threatened within hours of the show starting that he would NOT fight until he saw a contract. The show began and many fans at the show confirmed seeing Sapp leave the arena in disgust, no contract was ever produced and Sapp ended his relationship with K-1.

Scrambling for a new main event the K-1 heads looked to "Mr. K-1" Peter Aerts, who was to do guest commentating during the Hoost/Sapp fight, to fill in for Sapp. Aerts, being the champion that he was, took up the fight with no preparation and even had to borrow Semmy Schilt's shorts to fight in the ring. What went down was a classic albeit slow match between the two greatest men to enter the K-1 ring. Hoost was given the three-round decision but to everyone at the show both fighters gave Ernesto Hoost the perfect sendoff to the man they called "Mr. Perfect".

The Amsterdam GP event was finished off of course with a GP tournament which was won by the 6' 8" Bjorn Bregy. Also participating in the tournament was a returning Alexey Ignashov but he faltered in the semi finals against K-1 rookie, Gokhan Saki and never regained the prominence he once held in the K-1 ranks.

The 2006 Asia GP was one of the saddest GPs in a while. Most of the eight competitors did not look like they belonged in the K-1 ring. The only mentionable matchup was between Japanese fighter Tsuyoshi Nakasako and the short Thai fighter Kaoklai Kaennorsing. In the end the GP was won by former boxer turned K-1 fighter Yusuke Fujimoto. In the superfights K-1 vets Peter Aerts and Ray Sefo took out their young opponents Hiraku Hori and Ruslan Karaev, respectively by Knock outs. In the main event the battle of giants took place between Hong-man Choi and reigning WGP champion Semmy Schilt. Choi won a very disputed split decision which most observers believed was a home decision win.

Instead of the usual Japan GP in 2006 they instead decided to bring back the "Revenge" match concept that was very popular in the early K-1 days, matches that allowed a fighter to avenge a lost he suffered earlier. In the first revenge fight former WGP champion Peter Aerts took on sometime friend Gary Goodridge who was looking for revenge from their 2005 showdown where the "Lumberjack" Aerts chopped down Goodridge with some wicked leg kicks. This time around Goodridge fared better but still ended up losing a unanimous decision. Former WGP champion Remy Bonjasksy was looking for revenge against Mighty Mo who upset the young upstart in their hotly contested fight in Las Vegas. This time around the "Flying Gentleman" was able to use his quick kicks and movements to get the judges nod for the win and avenged his prior lost. The next revenge match was a rematch between the giants of K-1, Korean fighter Hong-man Choi and former Yokozuna Akebono. This would actually be the THIRD match between these two giants with Akebono losing both to Choi in the first round. This time around the Japanese superstar survived the first round but only lasted less than a minute in the second round before being knocked out. In the main event a very much demanded rematch took place between Japanese's favorite son MUSASHI and Brazilian fighter Glaube Feitosa who unceremoniously knocked MUSASHI out in the 2005 WGP Final. This time around MUSASHI fared better but still lost a unanimous decision to the Brazilian Kyokushinka.

The last stop before the 2006 WGP was the repecharge tourney in Las Vegas. For the eight fighters who participated in the tourney it was their last chance for a trip to Japan and the WGP. For one fighter in particular Alexey Ignashov, this was his last chance to redeem himself and try to achieve the success that many always thought he would achieve in the K-1. In the tournament, Ignashov was paired up with American kickboxer Imani Lee. During the fight Ignashov looked sluggish and not in shape, luckily though he was able to pull out a decision from the judges. For the "Red Scorpion" Ignashov could not continue into the second round and thus his WGP dreams were dashed again. Another fighter who was looking for a second chance was Stefan Leko. For a long time Leko was always a fan favorite yet could never get past the top echelon of K-1. With his last shot at the WGP, Leko tore through the competition with KOs over Scotty Lighty and former US GP champion Carter Williams. In the finals Leko got his chance to go to Japan with another KO win over another former US GP champion Michael McDonald.

As usual in the Final Elimination tournament for the WGP last year's eight finalist and the winners of the various GPs were paired up to select the final eight fighters who will participate in the WGP. Rounding out the final 16 fighters were last year's finalist Glaube Feitosa who started as a reserve fighter, "Mr. Perfect" Ernesto Hoost and "The Golden Boy" Badr Hari. Originally Peter Aerts was supposed to take part in the Final Elimination in a dream match against Remy Bonjasky but he fell with an illness. Replacing him was long time K-1 fan favorite Gary Goodridge. In the first match of the Eliminations, the future of K-1 collided in the form of Ruslan Karaev and Badr Hari. Many were eagerly anticipating this fight as it represented the true battle between opposites; the squeaky clean Karaev and the loud mouth Hari. The fight ended quickly and in controversy as Karaev knocked Hari down quickly and then accidentally kneed him in the face with what looked like an "illegal" knee. Hari refused to get up to meet the count and was thus given the lost. Hari screamed about the decision and even stated "he would never fight in K-1 again". In the next fight former K-1 WGP champion Remy Bonjasky took on Gary Goodridge in a competitive fight. Many were thinking Bonjasky would get by Goodridge easily but this fight went to the third round with Bonjasky looking a bit rusty. Finally Bonjasky caught Goodridge with a good kick to the gut and knocked him out. It took a decision for Glaube Feitosa to beat the tall Paul Slowinski while defending WGP champion Semmy Schilt easily overpowered Bjorn Bregy. In possibly the fight of the night, two long time K-1 favorites Ray Sefo and Stefan Leko went toe to toe in a brawl that went the extra round. In the end Leko barely squeaked by purely on conditioning and was given the ticket to the WGP finals. Ernesto Hoost easily took out Japan GP winner Yusuke Fujimoto with a few kicks to his leg while Chalid "Die Faust" took out Musashi showing that the Japanese favorite may soon be losing his touch. In the main event Jerome Le Banner started his quest to finally win a WGP by taking out the "Korean Giant" Hong-man Choi. It took everything that Le Banner had to get the win but he finally was able to walk away with the decision after an extra round.

The K-1 World Grand Prix 2006 in Tokyo Final was held for the last time at the Tokio Dome. Schilt defeated Aerts by unanimous decision to win his second consecutive GP.

See also
 Seidokaikan
 Full contact Karate
 Kazuyoshi Ishii

References

External links
K-1 Official website
K-1fans.com Everything about K-1

K-1